Achintya Kumar Sengupta (born 19 September 1903 – 29 January 1976) was an Indian Bengali-language poet, story writer, novelist, biographer and editor.

Life
He was born in Noakhali, now in Bangladesh. At the age of 13, after his father's death, Sengupta moved to Calcutta, where he completed his schooling. He got a B. A. Honours degree from South Suburban College in English, followed by an M. A. degree from the University of Calcutta. Subsequently, he obtained a degree in Law and entered the judicial service in 1928 as a Civil Judge (Junior Division) and Assistant Magistrate Second Class. He served as a Judge in Magistrate Courts of Kolkata and District Courts of Midnapore, Dinajpore, and Kushtia. He retired as a Principal District Judge of the Alipore Court in 1961.

Works
He started writing under a pen name, ‘Niharika Debi’. He contributed to almost all genres of Bengali literature, but is best remembered for his novels and short stories. In all, he wrote more than 100 books. Sengupta was closely associated with the famous magazine Kallol, and was its editor for some time.

Novels
Bede
Akoshik
Kakjoshna
Bibaher Cheye Boro
Endrani
Prachir O Prantor
Urnonav
Nobonita
Je Jai Boluk
Asumodru Antorongo
Prothom Kadom Phul

Story collections
Tuta Futa
Eti
Okalbosonto
Odhibus
Double Decker
Polayon
Jotonbibi
Sareng
Hari Muchi Dom
Kalorokto
Kath Khor Kerosine
Chasa Bhusha
Ekartri
Jashomoti

Poetry
Amabasya
Amra
Priya O Prithibi
Neel Akash
Purba Paschim
Uttarayan

Biographies
Param Purush Sriramkrishna-1
Param Purush Sriramkrishna-2
Param Purush Sriramkrishna-3
Param Purush Sriramkrishna-4
Poromaprokriti Sri Sarodamoni
Okhondo Omiyo Srigourango
Bireshor Bibekananda
Rotnakor Girishchandra
Amritapurush Jishu
Udyata Kharga Subhash

Others
Kollol Joog
Joishter Jhor

Awards 
He received the Jagattarini Award, Rabindra Puraskar and the Saratchandra Smriti Award in 1975 for his outstanding contributions to literature and journalism.

Death 
He died in Kolkata on 29 January 1976.

References

External links
 
 
 
 Achintya Kumar Sengupta at the West Bengal Public Library Network

Bengali writers
Bengali Hindus
Bengali novelists
20th-century Bengalis
Bengali-language writers
Indian male writers
Indian poets
Indian editors
Indian biographers
20th-century Indian biographers
Indian short story writers
Indian male short story writers
20th-century Indian short story writers
Indian novelists
Indian male novelists
Indian male poets
Bengali male poets
Bengali-language poets
1903 births
1976 deaths
Recipients of the Rabindra Puraskar
University of Calcutta alumni
20th-century Indian poets
20th-century Indian male writers
20th-century Indian writers
20th-century Indian novelists
20th-century Bengali poets
Writers from Kolkata

People from Noakhali District